The ΛCDM (Lambda cold dark matter) or Lambda-CDM model is a parameterization of the Big Bang cosmological model in which the universe contains three major components: first, a cosmological constant denoted by Lambda (Greek Λ) associated with dark energy; second, the postulated cold dark matter (abbreviated CDM); and third, ordinary matter. It is frequently referred to as the standard model of Big Bang cosmology because it is the simplest model that provides a reasonably good account of the following properties of the cosmos:

 the existence and structure of the cosmic microwave background
 the large-scale structure in the distribution of galaxies
 the observed abundances of hydrogen (including deuterium), helium, and lithium
 the accelerating expansion of the universe observed in the light from distant galaxies and supernovae

The model assumes that general relativity is the correct theory of gravity on cosmological scales.   It emerged in the late 1990s as a concordance cosmology, after a period of time when disparate observed properties of the universe appeared mutually inconsistent, and there was no consensus on the makeup of the energy density of the universe.

The ΛCDM model can be extended by adding cosmological inflation, quintessence, and other elements that are current areas of speculation and research in cosmology.

Some alternative models challenge the assumptions of the ΛCDM model. Examples of these are modified Newtonian dynamics, entropic gravity, modified gravity, theories of large-scale variations in the matter density of the universe, bimetric gravity, scale invariance of empty space, and decaying dark matter (DDM).

Overview

The ΛCDM model includes an expansion of metric space that is well documented both as the red shift of prominent spectral absorption or emission lines in the light from distant galaxies and as the time dilation in the light decay of supernova luminosity curves. Both effects are attributed to a Doppler shift in electromagnetic radiation as it travels across expanding space. Although this expansion increases the distance between objects that are not under shared gravitational influence, it does not increase the size of the objects (e.g. galaxies) in space. It also allows for distant galaxies to recede from each other at speeds greater than the speed of light; local expansion is less than the speed of light, but expansion summed across great distances can collectively exceed the speed of light.

The letter Λ (lambda) represents the cosmological constant, which is currently associated with a vacuum energy or dark energy in empty space that is used to explain the contemporary accelerating expansion of space against the attractive effects of gravity. A cosmological constant has negative pressure, which contributes to the stress–energy tensor that, according to the general theory of relativity, causes accelerating expansion. The fraction of the total energy density of our (flat or almost flat) universe that is dark energy, is estimated to be 0.669 ± 0.038 based on the 2018 Dark Energy Survey results using Type Ia Supernovae or  0.6847 ± 0.0073 based on the 2018 release of Planck satellite data, or more than 68.3% (2018 estimate) of the mass–energy density of the universe.

Dark matter is postulated in order to account for gravitational effects observed in very large-scale structures (the "flat" rotation curves of galaxies; the gravitational lensing of light by galaxy clusters; and enhanced clustering of galaxies) that cannot be accounted for by the quantity of observed matter.

Cold dark matter as currently hypothesized is:
non-baryonic It consists of matter other than protons and neutrons (and electrons, by convention, although electrons are not baryons).
cold Its velocity is far less than the speed of light at the epoch of radiation–matter equality (thus neutrinos are excluded, being non-baryonic but not cold).
dissipationless It cannot cool by radiating photons.
collisionless The dark matter particles interact with each other and other particles only through gravity and possibly the weak force.

Dark matter constitutes about 26.5% of the mass–energy density of the universe. The remaining 4.9% comprises all ordinary matter observed as atoms, chemical elements, gas and plasma, the stuff of which visible planets, stars and galaxies are made. The great majority of ordinary matter in the universe is unseen, since visible stars and gas inside galaxies and clusters account for less than 10% of the ordinary matter contribution to the mass–energy density of the universe.

Also, the energy density includes a very small fraction (~ 0.01%) in cosmic microwave background radiation, and not more than 0.5% in relic neutrinos. Although very small today, these were much more important in the distant past, dominating the matter at redshift > 3200.

The model includes a single originating event, the "Big Bang", which was not an explosion but the abrupt appearance of expanding spacetime containing radiation at temperatures of around 1015 K. This was immediately (within 10−29 seconds) followed by an exponential expansion of space by a scale multiplier of 1027 or more, known as cosmic inflation. The early universe remained hot (above 10,000 K) for several hundred thousand years, a state that is detectable as a residual cosmic microwave background, or CMB, a very low energy radiation emanating from all parts of the sky. The "Big Bang" scenario, with cosmic inflation and standard particle physics, is the only current cosmological model consistent with the observed continuing expansion of space, the observed distribution of lighter elements in the universe (hydrogen, helium, and lithium), and the spatial texture of minute irregularities (anisotropies) in the CMB radiation. Cosmic inflation also addresses the "horizon problem" in the CMB; indeed, it seems likely that the universe is larger than the observable particle horizon.

The model uses the Friedmann–Lemaître–Robertson–Walker metric, the Friedmann equations and the cosmological equations of state to describe the observable universe from right after the inflationary epoch to present and future.

Cosmic expansion history
The expansion of the universe is parameterized by a dimensionless scale factor  (with time  counted from the birth of the universe), defined relative to the present day, so ; the usual convention in cosmology is that subscript 0 denotes present-day values, so  is the current age of the universe. The scale factor is related to the observed redshift  of the light emitted at time  by

The expansion rate is described by the time-dependent Hubble parameter, defined as

where  is the time-derivative of the scale factor.  The first Friedmann equation gives the expansion rate in terms of the matter+radiation density  the curvature  and the cosmological constant 

A critical density  is the present-day density, which gives zero curvature , assuming the cosmological constant  is zero, regardless of its actual value. Substituting these conditions to the Friedmann equation gives

where  is the reduced Hubble constant.
If the cosmological constant were actually zero, the critical density would also mark the dividing line between eventual recollapse of the universe to a Big Crunch, or unlimited expansion. For the Lambda-CDM model with a positive cosmological constant (as observed), the universe is predicted to expand forever regardless of whether the total density is slightly above or below the critical density; though other outcomes are possible in extended models where the dark energy is not constant but actually time-dependent.

It is standard to define the present-day density parameter  for various species as the dimensionless ratio

the Friedmann equation can be conveniently rewritten in terms of the various density parameters as

where  is the equation of state parameter of dark energy, and assuming negligible neutrino mass (significant neutrino mass requires a more complex equation). In the general case this is integrated by computer to give the expansion history  and also observable distance–redshift relations for any chosen values of the cosmological parameters, which can then be compared with observations such as supernovae and baryon acoustic oscillations.

Observations show that the radiation density is very small today, ; if this term is neglected
the above has an analytic solution

where 
Solving for  gives the present age of the universe  in terms of the other parameters.

It follows that the transition from decelerating to accelerating expansion (the second derivative  crossing zero) occurred when

Historical development
The discovery of the cosmic microwave background (CMB) in 1964 confirmed a key prediction of the Big Bang cosmology. From that point on, it was generally accepted that the universe started in a hot, dense state and has been expanding over time. The rate of expansion depends on the types of matter and energy present in the universe, and in particular, whether the total density is above or below the so-called critical density.

During the 1970s, most attention focused on pure-baryonic models, but there were serious challenges explaining the formation of galaxies, given the small anisotropies in the CMB (upper limits at that time). In the early 1980s, it was realized that this could be resolved if cold dark matter dominated over the baryons, and the theory of cosmic inflation motivated models with critical density.

During the 1980s, most research focused on cold dark matter with critical density in matter, around 95% CDM and 5% baryons: these showed success at forming galaxies and clusters of galaxies, but problems remained; notably, the model required a Hubble constant lower than preferred by observations, and observations around 1988–1990 showed more large-scale galaxy clustering than predicted.

These difficulties sharpened with the discovery of CMB anisotropy by the Cosmic Background Explorer in 1992, and several modified CDM models, including ΛCDM and mixed cold and hot dark matter, came under active consideration through the mid-1990s. The ΛCDM model then became the leading model following the observations of accelerating expansion in 1998, and was quickly supported by other observations: in 2000, the BOOMERanG microwave background experiment measured the total (matter–energy) density to be close to 100% of critical, whereas in 2001 the 2dFGRS galaxy redshift survey measured the matter density to be near 25%; the large difference between these values supports a positive Λ or dark energy. Much more precise spacecraft measurements of the microwave background from WMAP in 2003–2010 and Planck in 2013–2015 have continued to support the model and pin down the parameter values, most of which are now constrained below 1 percent uncertainty.

There is currently active research into many aspects of the ΛCDM model, both to refine the parameters and to resolve the tensions between recent observations and the ΛCDM model, such as the Hubble tension and the CMB dipole. In addition, ΛCDM has no explicit physical theory for the origin or physical nature of dark matter or dark energy; the nearly scale-invariant spectrum of the CMB perturbations, and their image across the celestial sphere, are believed to result from very small thermal and acoustic irregularities at the point of recombination.

Historically, a large majority of astronomers and astrophysicists support the ΛCDM model or close relatives of it, but recent observations that contradict the ΛCDM model have recently led some astronomers and astrophysicists to search for alternatives to the ΛCDM model, which include dropping the Friedmann–Lemaître–Robertson–Walker metric or modifying dark energy. On the other hand, Milgrom, McGaugh, and Kroupa have long been leading critics of the ΛCDM model, attacking the dark matter portions of the theory from the perspective of galaxy formation models and supporting the alternative modified Newtonian dynamics (MOND) theory, which requires a modification of the Einstein field equations and the Friedmann equations as seen in proposals such as modified gravity theory (MOG theory) or tensor–vector–scalar gravity theory (TeVeS theory). Other proposals by theoretical astrophysicists of cosmological alternatives to Einstein's general relativity that attempt to account for dark energy or dark matter include f(R) gravity, scalar–tensor theories such as galileon theories, brane cosmologies, the DGP model, and massive gravity and its extensions such as bimetric gravity.

Successes
In addition to explaining many pre-2000 observations, the model has made a number of successful predictions: notably the existence of the baryon acoustic oscillation feature, discovered in 2005 in the predicted location; and the statistics of weak gravitational lensing, first observed in 2000 by several teams. The polarization of the CMB, discovered in 2002 by DASI, has been successfully predicted by the model: in the 2015 Planck data release, there are seven observed peaks in the temperature (TT) power spectrum, six peaks in the temperature–polarization (TE) cross spectrum, and five peaks in the polarization (EE) spectrum. The six free parameters can be well constrained by the TT spectrum alone, and then the TE and EE spectra can be predicted theoretically to few-percent precision with no further adjustments allowed.

Challenges
Over the years, numerous simulations of ΛCDM and observations of our universe have been made that challenge the validity of the ΛCDM model, to the point where some cosmologists now believe that the ΛCDM model may be superseded by another standard cosmological model.

Lack of detection
Extensive searches for dark matter particles have so far shown no well-agreed detection; the dark energy may be almost impossible to detect in a laboratory, and its value is unnaturally small compared to vacuum energy theoretical predictions.

Violations of the cosmological principle

The ΛCDM model has been shown to satisfy the cosmological principle, which states that, on a large-enough scale, the universe looks the same in all directions (isotropy) and from every location (homogeneity); "the universe looks the same whoever and wherever you are." The cosmological principle exists because when the predecessors of the ΛCDM model were first being developed, there was not sufficient data available to distinguish between more complex anisotropic or inhomogeneous models, so homogeneity and isotropy were assumed to simplify the models, and the assumptions were carried over into the ΛCDM model. However, recent findings have suggested that violations of the cosmological principle, especially of isotropy, exist. These violations have called the ΛCDM model into question, with some authors suggesting that the cosmological principle is now obsolete or that the Friedmann–Lemaître–Robertson–Walker metric breaks down in the late universe. This has additional implications for the validity of the cosmological constant in the ΛCDM model, as dark energy is implied by observations only if the cosmological principle is true.

Violations of isotropy
Evidence from galaxy clusters, quasars, and type Ia supernovae suggest that isotropy is violated on large scales.

Data from the Planck Mission shows hemispheric bias in the cosmic microwave background in two respects: one with respect to average temperature (i.e. temperature fluctuations), the second with respect to larger variations in the degree of perturbations (i.e. densities). The European Space Agency (the governing body of the Planck Mission) has concluded that these anisotropies in the CMB are, in fact, statistically significant and can no longer be ignored.

Already in 1967, Dennis Sciama predicted that the cosmic microwave background has a significant dipole anisotropy. In recent years, the CMB dipole has been tested, and current results suggest our motion with respect to distant radio galaxies and quasars differs from our motion with respect to the cosmic microwave background. The same conclusion has been reached in recent studies of the Hubble diagram of Type Ia supernovae and quasars. This contradicts the cosmological principle.

The CMB dipole is hinted at through a number of other observations. First, even within the cosmic microwave background, there are curious directional alignments and an anomalous parity asymmetry that may have an origin in the CMB dipole. Separately, the CMB dipole direction has emerged as a preferred direction in studies of alignments in quasar polarizations, scaling relations in galaxy clusters, strong lensing time delay, Type Ia supernovae, and quasars and gamma-ray bursts as standard candles. The fact that all these independent observables, based on different physics, are tracking the CMB dipole direction suggests that the Universe is anisotropic in the direction of the CMB dipole.

Nevertheless, some authors have stated that the universe around Earth is isotropic at high significance by studies of the cosmic microwave background temperature maps.

Violations of homogeneity
Based on N-body simulations in ΛCDM, Yadav and his colleagues showed that the spatial distribution of galaxies is statistically homogeneous if averaged over scales 260/h Mpc or more. However, many large-scale structures have been discovered, and some authors have reported some of the structures to be in conflict with the predicted scale of homogeneity for ΛCDM, including
 The Clowes–Campusano LQG, discovered in 1991, which has a length of 580 Mpc
 The Sloan Great Wall, discovered in 2003, which has a length of 423 Mpc, 
 U1.11, a large quasar group discovered in 2011, which has a length of 780 Mpc
 The Huge-LQG, discovered in 2012, which is three times longer than and twice as wide as is predicted possible according to ΛCDM
 The Hercules–Corona Borealis Great Wall, discovered in November 2013, which has a length of 2000–3000 Mpc (more than seven times that of the SGW)
The Giant Arc, discovered in June 2021, which has a length of 1000 Mpc

Other authors claim that the existence of structures larger than the scale of homogeneity in the ΛCDM model does not necessarily violate the cosmological principle in the ΛCDM model.

El Gordo galaxy cluster collision

El Gordo is an interacting galaxy cluster in the early Universe. The extreme properties of El Gordo in terms of its redshift, mass, and the collision velocity leads to strong tension with the ΛCDM model. The properties of El Gordo are however consistent with cosmological simulations in the framework of MOND due to more rapid structure formation.

KBC void

The KBC void is an immense, comparatively empty region of space containing the Milky Way approximately 2 billion light-years (600 megaparsecs, Mpc) in diameter.

Hubble tension

The Hubble tension in cosmology is widely acknowledged to be a major problem for the ΛCDM model. In December 2021, National Geographic reported that the cause of the Hubble tension discrepancy is not known. However, if the cosmological principle fails (see Violations of the cosmological principle), then the existing interpretations of the Hubble constant and the Hubble tension have to be revised, which might resolve the Hubble tension.

Some authors postulate that the Hubble tension can be explained entirely by the KBC void, as measuring galactic supernovae inside a void is predicted by the authors to yield a larger local value for the Hubble constant than cosmological measures of the Hubble constant. However, other work has found no evidence for this in observations, finding the scale of the claimed underdensity to be incompatible with observations which extend beyond its radius. Important deficiencies were subsequently pointed out in this analysis, leaving open the possibility that the Hubble tension is indeed caused by outflow from the KBC void.

As a result of the Hubble tension, other researchers have called for new physics beyond the ΛCDM model. Moritz Haslbauer et al. proposed that MOND would resolve the Hubble tension. Another group of researchers led by Marc Kamionkowski proposed a cosmological model with early dark energy to replace ΛCDM.

S8 tension
The  tension in cosmology is another major problem for the ΛCDM model. The  parameter in the ΛCDM model quantifies the amplitude of matter fluctuations in the late universe and is defined as

However, these two categories of measurement differ by more standard deviations than their uncertainties. This discrepancy is called the  tension. The name "tension" reflects that the disagreement is not merely between two data sets: the many sets of early- and late-time measurements agree well within their own categories, but there is an unexplained difference between values obtained from different points in the evolution of the universe. Such a tension indicates that the ΛCDM model may be incomplete or in need of correction.

Axis of evil

The ΛCDM model assumes that the data of the cosmic microwave background and our interpretation of the CMB are correct. However, there exists an apparent correlation between the plane of the Solar System, the rotation of galaxies, and certain aspects of the CMB. This may indicate that there is something wrong with the data or the interpretation of the cosmic microwave background used as evidence for the ΛCDM model, or that the Copernican principle and cosmological principle are violated.

Cosmological lithium problem

The actual observable amount of lithium in the universe is less than the calculated amount from the ΛCDM model by a factor of 3–4. If every calculation is correct, then solutions beyond the existing ΛCDM model might be needed.

Shape of the universe

The ΛCDM model assumes that the shape of the universe is flat (zero curvature). However, recent Planck data have hinted that the shape of the universe might in fact be closed (positive curvature), which would contradict the ΛCDM model. Some authors have suggested that the Planck data detecting a positive curvature could be evidence of a local inhomogeneity in the curvature of the universe rather than the universe actually being closed.

Violations of the strong equivalence principle

The ΛCDM model assumes that the strong equivalence principle is true. However, in 2020 a group of astronomers analyzed data from the Spitzer Photometry and Accurate Rotation Curves (SPARC) sample, together with estimates of the large-scale external gravitational field from an all-sky galaxy catalog. They concluded that there was highly statistically significant evidence of violations of the strong equivalence principle in weak gravitational fields in the vicinity of rotationally supported galaxies. They observed an effect inconsistent with tidal effects in the ΛCDM model.

Cold dark matter discrepancies

Several discrepancies between the predictions of cold dark matter in the ΛCDM model and observations of galaxies and their clustering have arisen. Some of these problems have proposed solutions, but it remains unclear whether they can be solved without abandoning the ΛCDM model.

Cuspy halo problem

The density distributions of dark matter halos in cold dark matter simulations (at least those that do not include the impact of baryonic feedback) are much more peaked than what is observed in galaxies by investigating their rotation curves.

Dwarf galaxy problem
 
Cold dark matter simulations predict large numbers of small dark matter halos, more numerous than the number of small dwarf galaxies that are observed around galaxies like the Milky Way.

Satellite disk problem
Dwarf galaxies around the Milky Way and Andromeda galaxies are observed to be orbiting in thin, planar structures whereas the simulations predict that they should be distributed randomly about their parent galaxies. However, latest research suggests this seemigly bizarre alignment is just a quirk which will dissolve over time.

High-velocity galaxy problem
Galaxies in the NGC 3109 association are moving away too rapidly to be consistent with expectations in the ΛCDM model. In this framework, NGC 3109 is too massive and distant from the Local Group for it to have been flung out in a three-body interaction involving the Milky Way or Andromeda Galaxy.

Galaxy morphology problem
If galaxies grew hierarchically, then massive galaxies required many mergers. Major mergers inevitably create a classical bulge. On the contrary, about 80% of observed galaxies give evidence of no such bulges, and giant pure-disc galaxies are commonplace. The tension can be quantified by comparing the observed distribution of galaxy shapes today with predictions from high-resolution hydrodynamical cosmological simulations in the ΛCDM framework, revealing a highly significant problem that is unlikely to be solved by improving the resolution of the simulations. The high bulgeless fraction was nearly constant for 8 billion years.

Fast galaxy bar problem
If galaxies were embedded within massive halos of cold dark matter, then the bars that often develop in their central regions would be slowed down by dynamical friction with the halo. This is in serious tension with the fact that observed galaxy bars are typically fast.

Small scale crisis
Comparison of the model with observations may have some problems on sub-galaxy scales, possibly predicting too many dwarf galaxies and too much dark matter in the innermost regions of galaxies. This problem is called the "small scale crisis".  These small scales are harder to resolve in computer simulations, so it is not yet clear whether the problem is the simulations, non-standard properties of dark matter, or a more radical error in the model.

High redshift galaxies
Observations from the James Webb Space Telescope have resulted in various galaxies confirmed by spectroscopy at high redshift, such as JADES-GS-z13-0 at cosmological redshift of 13.2. Other candidate galaxies which have not been confirmed by spectroscopy include CEERS-93316 at cosmological redshift of 16.4. 

Existence of surprisingly massive galaxies in the early universe challenges the currently preferred models describing how dark matter halos drive galaxy formation. It remains to be seen whether a revision of the Lambda-CDM model with parameters given by Planck Collaboration is necessary to resolve this issue. The discrepancies could also be explained by particular properties (stellar masses or effective volume) of the candidate galaxies, yet unknown force or particle outside of the Standard Model through which dark matter interacts, more efficient baryonic matter accumulation by the dark matter halos, early dark energy models, or the hypothesized long-sought Population III stars.

Missing baryon problem

Massimo Persic and Paolo Salucci first estimated the baryonic density today present in ellipticals, spirals, groups and clusters of galaxies.
They performed an integration of the baryonic mass-to-light ratio over luminosity (in the following ), weighted with the luminosity function  over the previously mentioned classes of astrophysical objects:

The result was:

where .

Note that this value is much lower than the prediction of standard cosmic nucleosynthesis , so that stars and gas in galaxies and in galaxy groups and clusters account for less than 10% of the primordially synthesized baryons. This issue is known as the problem of the "missing baryons".

The missing baryon problem is claimed to be resolved. Using observations of the kinematic Sunyaev–Zel'dovich effect spanning more than 90% of the lifetime of the Universe, in 2021 astrophysicists found that approximately 50% of all baryonic matter is outside dark matter haloes, filling the space between galaxies. Together with the amount of baryons inside galaxies and surrounding these, the total amount of baryons in the late time Universe is now compatible with early Universe measurements.

Unfalsifiability
It has been argued that the ΛCDM model is built upon a foundation of conventionalist stratagems, rendering it unfalsifiable in the sense defined by Karl Popper.

Parameters
 

The simple ΛCDM model is based on six parameters: physical baryon density parameter; physical dark matter density parameter; the age of the universe; scalar spectral index; curvature fluctuation amplitude; and reionization optical depth. In accordance with Occam's razor, six is the smallest number of parameters needed to give an acceptable fit to current observations; other possible parameters are fixed at "natural" values, e.g. total density parameter = 1.00, dark energy equation of state = −1. (See below for extended models that allow these to vary.)

The values of these six parameters are mostly not predicted by current theory (though, ideally, they may be related by a future "Theory of Everything"), except that most versions of cosmic inflation predict the scalar spectral index should be slightly smaller than 1, consistent with the estimated value 0.96. The parameter values, and uncertainties, are estimated using large computer searches to locate the region of parameter space providing an acceptable match to cosmological observations. From these six parameters, the other model values, such as the Hubble constant and the dark energy density, can be readily calculated.

Commonly, the set of observations fitted includes the cosmic microwave background anisotropy, the brightness/redshift relation for supernovae, and large-scale galaxy clustering including the baryon acoustic oscillation feature. Other observations, such as the Hubble constant, the abundance of galaxy clusters, weak gravitational lensing and globular cluster ages, are generally consistent with these, providing a check of the model, but are less precisely measured at present.

Parameter values listed below are from the Planck Collaboration Cosmological parameters 68% confidence limits for the base ΛCDM model from Planck CMB power spectra, in combination with lensing reconstruction and external data (BAO + JLA + H0). See also Planck (spacecraft).

Extended models

Extended models allow one or more of the "fixed" parameters above to vary, in addition to the basic six; so these models join smoothly to the basic six-parameter model in the limit that the additional parameter(s) approach the default values. For example, possible extensions of the simplest ΛCDM model allow for spatial curvature ( may be different from 1); or quintessence rather than a cosmological constant where the equation of state of dark energy is allowed to differ from −1. Cosmic inflation predicts tensor fluctuations (gravitational waves). Their amplitude is parameterized by the tensor-to-scalar ratio (denoted ), which is determined by the unknown energy scale of inflation. Other modifications allow hot dark matter in the form of neutrinos more massive than the minimal value, or a running spectral index; the latter is generally not favoured by simple cosmic inflation models.

Allowing additional variable parameter(s) will generally increase the uncertainties in the standard six parameters quoted above, and may also shift the central values slightly. The Table below shows results for each of the possible "6+1" scenarios with one additional variable parameter; this indicates that, as of 2015, there is no convincing evidence that any additional parameter is different from its default value.

Some researchers have suggested that there is a running spectral index, but no statistically significant study has revealed one. Theoretical expectations suggest that the tensor-to-scalar ratio  should be between 0 and 0.3, and the latest results are now within those limits.

See also
 Bolshoi Cosmological Simulation
 Galaxy formation and evolution
 Illustris project
 List of cosmological computation software
 Millennium Run
 Weakly interacting massive particles (WIMPs)
 The ΛCDM model is also known as the standard model of cosmology, but is not related to the Standard Model of particle physics.

References

Further reading

External links
 Cosmology tutorial/NedWright
 Millennium Simulation
 WMAP estimated cosmological parameters/Latest Summary

Physical cosmology
Dark matter
Dark energy
Concepts in astronomy
Scientific models